Elliot Brett Levine (born September 28, 1963) is an American pianist and keyboardist. He had two record releases on the Nashville-based Artifex records label between 1999 and 2004.  His CD projects have been reviewed in the Wall Street Journal Online and the Washington Post. In March 2012 he was the first person to use an iPad Keytar, an iPad with a guitar strap, in a live performance posted to YouTube.

Levine has toured with Wilson Pickett and Heatwave (Always & Forever/Boogie Nights). He has opened for Brian McKnight, Freddie Jackson, McCoy Tyner, and Gerald Albright. He has had the #1 song on mp3.com, receiving over 1,000,000 downloads, which was mentioned in the Wall Street Journal and CNN.

Levine has four internationally released CDs.  He has headlined at Blues Alley and the Kennedy Center. His playing has been described by Jazz Times as "showing plenty of talent, though also criticized as having "feather-weight play against heavy-leaden R&B backdrops". In 2003, he scored the music to an Emmy nominated documentary, "Teens in Between". His music was also used on "Inside the NBA" on TBS (TV Channel) (2001), as well as an independent college movie, "Friends With Benefits" (2003).  He is also featured on the worldwide Karvavena release "The Abduction of the Art of Noise". He currently tours in the United States as a member of Heatwave.  It was reported that he is part owner of Authentic (racehorse), the horse that won the Kentucky Derby

Discography

As leader
 Sugar Honey Iced Tea (2022) Tilley
 347 Live! (2013) Tilley
 Live +7 (2007) Tilley
 The Funk, The Whole Funk, and Nothin' But the Funk (2004) Tilley
 Live Bootleg (2001) MP3.COM
 Live at Bayou Blues (2001) MP3.COM 
 Smash, with Ron Holloway (2000) Tilley
 Urban Grooves (1997) Artifex Records
 Urban Grooves EP (1997) Artifex Records
 With Light Images (1993) Artifex Records

As sideman
 Keith Mason  I Surrender All (2020) Independent
 Christian "Big New York" de Mesones  They Call me Big New York (2020) Independent
 Christian "Big New York" de Mesones  Latin Jive Redux (2017) Independent
 Christian "Big New York" de Mesones  Good Old Days (2016) Independent
 Kenny Wright Experience Herbie Miles and Me (2010) Knee Deep Records
 Tony Whitfield Pleasure Sensitive 2 (2004) OASA Records
 Tony Whitfield New York Hustle, with Onaje Allan Gumbs, Hiram Bullock, and Jerry Hey (2003) OASA Records
 Eddie Anderson Good Friends (2003) Independent
 Eddie Anderson Christmas Album (2002) Independent
 Tony Whitfield Pleasure Sensitive 2 (2000) OASA Records
 Ski Johnson Ski Supreme (2000) Wide-A-Wake Records
 Pete Marinovich Second Voice (1999)
 Eddie Anderson Thick Funk (1999) Independent
 Moose and the Bulletproof Blues Band Movin On'  (1996) Blues Cancer Records
 Ski Johnson in Your Eyes (1994) Wide-A-Wake Records
 Ski Johnson Tell Me Something Good EP (1994) Wide-A-Wake Records
 Ivan Smart Red Nights (1992) Smart-eye Productions

Compilations
 The Abduction of the Art of Noise (2004) Karvavena Records
 Walking on Pennsylvania Avenue (2001) Open Source Music 
 MP3.COM 103 of the best songs you've never heard, vol. 4 (2000) MP3.COM
 The Best of Artifex Records (1997) Artifex Records
 Artifex Records American Express Jazz Sampler (1994) Artifex Records

References

Jewish American musicians
Living people
1963 births
Musicians from Washington, D.C.
American jazz pianists
American male pianists
Musicians
Jewish jazz musicians
Heatwave (band) members
20th-century American pianists
21st-century American pianists
20th-century American male musicians
21st-century American male musicians
American male jazz musicians
21st-century American Jews